Parse.ly is a technology company that provides web analytics and content optimization software for online publishers.  Parse.ly built three products, the Parse.ly Reader, the Parse.ly Publisher Platform, and the latest Parse.ly Dash, an analytics tool for large publishers.

Overview
Parse.ly is a content optimization platform for online publishers. Parse.ly's product, Dash, is built on top of the Parse.ly platform.  Dash parses articles on a publisher's site, and then analyzes them to identify data around metrics that are specific for publishers such as topics, authors, sections, and referrers. The technology it uses to do this is natural language processing, and has extracted over 350,000 unique topics from the URLs it has crawled. In addition to providing site analytics, Dash can show users what topics are resonating with people across the web through their webwide trends interface.

Parse.ly was founded by Sachin Kamdar and Andrew Montalenti out of DreamIt Ventures, an early stage startup accelerator program in Philadelphia and launched its first product, Parse.ly Reader, in September 2009.

Funding
In May 2009, Parse.ly received $20k in seed funding from DreamIt Ventures. In December 2010, Parse.ly received $1.8M in Series A funding from Blumberg Capital, ff Venture Capital, Scott Becker (cofounder of Invite Media), Don Hutchison, Jonathan Axelrod, and Jeffrey Greenblatt.

In February 2021, Parse.ly was acquired by Automattic.  The financial terms of the acquisition were not disclosed.

References

External links 

DreamIt Ventures
 
 
Poynter | Parse.ly Dash Offers News Sites Analytics by Author Topic
VentureBeat | Parse.ly launches predictive analytics dashboard for publishers
TNW | Dash is analytics built specifically for publishers
BetaBeat | Parse.ly Launches Dash, Analytics with a Scalpel
SiliconAngle | Smart Data Makes Smarter Editors: Parse.ly Launches Dash to the World
ProgrammableWeb | Dashing Analytics for Publishers Shows Value of APIs
SiliconFilter | Parse.ly Launches a Smarter Analytics Platform for Publishers
WWWireFrame | Dash offers analytics tailor-made for online publishers
GigaOM | Revolutionizing web publishing with big data
BetaKit | Publishers Looking to Leverage Big Data to Understand Readers
 CMSWire | Dash Analytics from Parse.ly Help Publishers Get Smart

Online companies of the United States
Web analytics
Technology companies established in 2009
2021 mergers and acquisitions
2009 establishments in New York City